The 2007 Liège–Bastogne–Liège road bicycle race monument was held on April 29. The race was run in the Belgian region of Wallonia.  The race is organised by Amaury Sport Organisation and the Royal Pesant Club Liégeois according to the rules of the Union Cycliste Internationale (UCI) and the Royal Belgian Cycling League

Final standings - 2007-04-29: Liège–Ans, 262 km

General classification

Climbs classification 
In addition to the overall title for general classification, the race includes 12 uphill sections.  Points awarded for these uphill sections are 4, 2 and 1 points for the 1st, 2nd, and 3rd placed riders, respectively.  The rider must finish the race for the points to be awarded.  If a points tie exists between riders, then the best rider in the general classification is awarded the higher placing.

Individual 2007 UCI ProTour standings after race 
As of April 29, 2007, after the Liège-Bastogne-Liège 

Race winner, Danilo Di Luca, moved up from 11th place to 3rd place, while podium finishers, Alejandro Valverde, moved into second place behind UCI ProTour jersey wearer, Davide Rebellin.  The 3rd place podium finisher, Fränk Schleck, jumped from 29th place to 7th in the overall standings.

 82 riders have scored at least one point on the 2007 UCI ProTour.

References

External links

Race website

2007
2007 UCI ProTour
2007 in Belgian sport